Kenneth Raymond Hodge, Sr. (born 25 June 1944) is an English-born Canadian former hockey player who played in the National Hockey League (NHL) for the Chicago Black Hawks, Boston Bruins and New York Rangers. He was born in Birmingham, England, but grew up in Toronto, Ontario.

Playing career
One of the few British-born players in NHL history, Ken Hodge was signed by the Black Hawks as a teenager, and had a stellar junior league career with the St. Catharines Black Hawks of the Ontario Hockey Association (OHA), leading the league in goals and points in the 1965 season before being called up for good to Chicago the next year.

Stereotyped as a grinding policeman — at 6'2", 215 lbs, Hodge was one of the larger forwards of his era — the rangy right wing played two mediocre seasons with the Black Hawks before being sent to Boston in a blockbuster deal with teammates Phil Esposito and Fred Stanfield. The trade made the Bruins into a powerhouse, as Esposito centred Hodge and left wing Ron Murphy in the  season to break the NHL record for points in a season by a forward line, and Hodge scored an impressive 45 goals and 45 assists to complement Esposito's record season of 126 points. His production fell off significantly the next season (although Boston won the Stanley Cup bolstered by Hodge's skilled play), but the  season saw the Bruins launch the greatest offensive juggernaut the league had ever seen, breaking dozens of offensive records. In that flurry, on one of the most feared forward lines of the era (with linemates Esposito and Wayne Cashman), Hodge would break the league record for points in a season by a right winger with 105, and finish fourth in NHL scoring. Phil Esposito (with 152 points), Bobby Orr (with 139), Johnny Bucyk (116) and Hodge finished 1–2–3–4 in league scoring, the first time in NHL history the season's top four scorers all played for one team.

The  season saw Hodge slowed down by injuries, although he recovered again in the playoffs to help the Bruins to their second Stanley Cup in three years. In , he scored 50 goals and 105 points to place third in league scoring, and with Esposito (145), Orr (122) and Cashman (89) likewise finished 1–2–3–4 in league scoring for the only other time in NHL history the season's top four scorers all played for one team.

His offensive production negatively impacted by Esposito's trade to the New York Rangers in early-November 1975, Hodge's remaining time with the Bruins was spent in head coach Don Cherry's doghouse. Hodge was reunited with Esposito on May 26, 1976, when he was dealt to the Rangers who were hoping for a replication of their successes with the Bruins. The transaction cost the team Rick Middleton who was ten years younger and a swifter skater than Hodge.

Retirement
Hodge had only modest success in New York in the 1976–77 season, and tailed off badly the following year before being sent down to the New Haven Nighthawks of the American Hockey League (AHL). Hodge retired thereafter, but came out of retirement in 1979–80 to play for the Binghamton Dusters of the AHL, in his final professional season.

Hodge finished his NHL career with 881 games, 328 goals, 472 assists and 800 points. He still lives in the Boston area, and remains active with the Bruins' alumni team and in alumni affairs.

Most recently, Hodge has been working as a broadcaster in Boston. He served as the radio colour commentator for the Boston College men's hockey team throughout their 2007–08 NCAA Championship season, working alongside play-by-play man Jon Rish on flagship station WTTT (1150AM).

Personal life
Hodge lived in Lynnfield, Massachusetts during his career with the Bruins; his home was instantly recognisable and well known to local residents by its large swimming pool in the back yard in the shape of his Bruins' uniform number, 8.

Hodge's son, Ken Hodge, Jr., was also a professional hockey player from 1987 to 1998. Hodge Jr. went on to coach the Tulsa Oilers, whose roster included his younger brother Brendon, who wore their father's number 8. Brendon Hodge is now the assistant coach of the Rapid City Rushmore Thunder varsity hockey team, who won the 2014 state championship. Another son, Dan Hodge, was drafted by the Boston Bruins in the ninth round (194th overall) in the 1991 NHL Entry Draft, and played in the American Hockey League and International Hockey League, and won the 2000 Kelly Cup championship in the East Coast Hockey League with the Peoria Rivermen.

Achievements
 Named a First Team All-Star in 1971 and 1974.
 Played in the All-Star Game in 1971, 1973 and 1974.
 Two time Stanley Cup champion (1970 and 1972)

Career statistics

See also
List of National Hockey League players from the United Kingdom
List of NHL players with 100-point seasons

References

External links
 

1944 births
Living people
Binghamton Dusters players
Boston Bruins players
Buffalo Bisons (AHL) players
Canadian ice hockey right wingers
Chicago Blackhawks players
Edmonton Oil Kings (WCHL) coaches
English emigrants to Canada
English ice hockey players
New Haven Nighthawks players
New York Rangers players
Portland Winterhawks coaches
St. Catharines Teepees players
St. Catharines Black Hawks players
Sportspeople from Birmingham, West Midlands
Ice hockey people from Toronto
Stanley Cup champions
Canadian ice hockey coaches
Canadian expatriate ice hockey players in the United States
Canadian emigrants to the United States